Kim Young-tae (born 15 May 1975) is a South Korean weightlifter. He competed in the men's featherweight event at the 2000 Summer Olympics.

References

1975 births
Living people
South Korean male weightlifters
Olympic weightlifters of South Korea
Weightlifters at the 2000 Summer Olympics
Place of birth missing (living people)